Electro Beatbox is an early Electro/Old school hip hop compilation album released by Decadance Recordings in 2002.

Track listing
 West Street Mob - "Break Dance - Electric Boogie" (5:08) 
 The 45 King - "The 900 Number" (2:54) 
 J.V.C. F.O.R.C.E. - "Strong Island" (5:49) 
 Young MC - "Know How" (Instrumental) (4:34) 
 Ultramagnetic MC's - "Travelling at the Speed of Thought" (1:50) 
 Twin Hype - "For Those Who Like to Groove" (6:22) 
 Grandmaster Flash & Melle Mel - "White Lines (Don't Do It)" (7:26) 
 The Funkmaster - "All Funked Up" (3:52) 
 Vinyl Media - "The Bomb" (3:50) 
 Intrigue Featuring Jenny Bean  - "Curiosity" (3:46) 
 Funky Four Plus One More - "That's the Joint" (9:18) 
 Grandmaster Flash - "The Adventures of Grandmaster Flash on the Wheels of Steel" (7:00) 
 Whodini - "Magic's Wand" (5:33) 
 Newcleus - "Jam on It" (8:33) 
 Herbie Hancock - "Rockit" (5:20) 
 Hashim - "Al-Naafiysh (The Soul)" (7:42) 
 Sugarhill Gang - "Rapper's Delight" (Ben Liebrand DMC Remix) (7:01)  
 Egyptian Lover - "Egypt Egypt" (5:24) 
 Nick Stansby - "Year of the Tiger" (4:33) 
 Code Red -  "Natural Law" (3:57) 
 T La Rock - "Breaking Bells" (3:23) 
 Davy DMX - "One for the Treble" (6:27) 
 Spoonie Gee - "The Godfather" (2:55) 
 Crash Crew - "Breaking Bells (Take Me to the Mardi Gras)" (7:20) 
 Cryme - "Question Why?" (3:40) 
 MC Mowgli - "Addict" (4:04) 
 Solo - "Main Train" (4:07) 
 Tyrant - "Trigonometry" (3:39) 
 MC Science - "Armageddon" (3:54) 
 MC Scott - "Suzie" (4:22)

Hip hop compilation albums
2002 compilation albums